

The 2007 United Nations Climate Change Conference took place at the Bali International Conference Centre, Nusa Dua, Bali, Indonesia, between December 3 and December 15, 2007 (though originally planned to end on 14 December). Representatives from over 180 countries attended, together with observers from intergovernmental and nongovernmental organizations. The conference encompassed meetings of several bodies, including the 13th Conference of the Parties to the United Nations Framework Convention on Climate Change (COP 13), the 3rd Meeting of the Parties to the Kyoto Protocol (MOP 3 or CMP 3), together with other subsidiary bodies and a meeting of ministers.

Negotiations on a successor to the Kyoto Protocol dominated the conference. A meeting of environment ministers and experts held in June called on the conference to agree on a road-map, timetable and "concrete steps for the negotiations" with a view to reaching an agreement by 2009. It has been debated whether this global meeting on climate change has achieved anything significant at all.

Initial EU proposals called for global emissions to peak in 10 to 15 years and decline "well below half" of the 2000 level by 2050 for developing countries and for developed countries to achieve emissions levels 20-40% below 1990 levels by 2020. The United States strongly opposed these numbers, at times backed by Japan, Canada, Australia and Russia. The resulting compromise mandates "deep cuts in global emissions" with references to the IPCC's Fourth Assessment Report.

See also 

Bali Communiqué from 150 global business leaders
Bali Road Map
Post–Kyoto Protocol negotiations on greenhouse gas emissions
Bali Declaration by Climate Scientists

Further reading

References

External links 

 The United Nations Climate Change Conference in Bali from UNFCCC
 https://web.archive.org/web/20111006155502/http://www.climate.web.id/
 Bali summit mini-site from BBC News

News
 December 18, 2007, Sydney Morning Herald: Answer to hot air was in fact a chilling blunder
 December 17, 2007, Guardian unlimited:  "We've been suckered again by the US. So far the Bali deal is worse than Kyoto" by George Monbiot, Guardian
 December 16, 2007, Guardian unlimited: "At last, some wisdom on global warming" Observer leading article.
 December 15, 2007, Bloomberg.com: U.S. & Developing Nations Compromise on Climate Talks
 December 15, 2007, Reuters: Chronology: U.S. U-turn brings Bali climate deal
 December 15, 2007, Reuters: High and low points of Bali climate talks
 December 14, 2007, India eNews: US throws climate change summit out of gear at last moment
 December 13, 2007, India eNews: Al Gore's oratory electrifies Bali summit
 December 3, 2007, Reuters: Australia steals show at Bali climate talks
 December 3, 2007, New York Times: Climate Talks Take on Added Urgency After Report

2007
2007
Diplomatic conferences in Indonesia
21st-century diplomatic conferences (UN)
2007 in international relations
2007 in Indonesia
2007 in the environment
21st century in Bali
December 2007 events in Asia